The change in public sector net worth in any given forecast year is largely driven by the operating balance and property, plant and equipment revaluations.

Research suggests that the main fiscal factor driving bond yields hence appears to be government net worth.

Focusing on net worth as the most comprehensive measure of fiscal position incentivizes the public sector to invest the proceeds of borrowing in productive investments rather than use debt to finance consumption spending. Net worth also provides a tool for assessing whether government policy is fair to future generations from a financial point of view; negative, or declining, net worth indicates that past or present consumption will need to be funded by future taxation.

References

Accounting terminology
Finance
Public finance